Kevin Hartz is an American businessman in the technology industry. He is the co-founder of Xoom, of which he was the CEO from 2001 to 2005.

Biography

Hartz was born in Berkeley, California, and raised in Orinda, California. His high school was Miramonte High School, Orinda, Calif. 

He holds a Bachelor of Arts and Science from Stanford University in history. 

He also hold a Master of Arts degree in British history from University College, Oxford.

Career
Hartz began his career at Silicon Graphics (SGI) as the product manager for the virtual reality browser Cosmo Player. Hartz was a co-founder of ConnectGroup, a start-up providing high-speed Internet access to the hotel industry. Five months after incorporating the company, it was acquired by LodgeNet (NASDAQ: LNET).

In 2001, Hartz co-founded Xoom, an international money remittance business, along with Alan Braverman. He served as CEO until 2005 and served on the Board of Directors through its 2012 IPO and subsequent acquisition by PayPal in 2015. The company had a total equity value of $1.1 billion.

Hartz founded Eventbrite, the global self-service ticketing platform, in 2006 with Julia Hartz and Renaud Visage.

Hartz joined Founders Fund in September 2016 and served as a partner but announced his exit from the company in June 2018. He currently serves on the Board of Directors for Eventbrite (Chairman) and Lookout.

Investments
Hartz began his early-stage investing after the sale of Connect Group to LodgeNet. He took the profits from that sale and invested in a company called FieldLink, which later became Confinity, which then became PayPal.

Personal life
Hartz lives in San Francisco with his wife, Julia Hartz, and their two daughters.

References

American technology executives
American business executives
Living people
People from Orinda, California
Date of birth missing (living people)
Year of birth missing (living people)
Alumni of University College, Oxford
Stanford University alumni